Minh Hương ( or ) refers to descendants of Ming dynasty immigrants who settled in southern Vietnam during the 16th and 18th centuries. They were among the first wave of ethnic Han who came to southern Vietnam.

Ming refugees of Han ethnicity numbering 3,000 came to Vietnam at the end of the Ming dynasty. They opposed the Qing dynasty and were fiercely loyal to the Ming dynasty. Vietnamese women married these Han refugees since most of them were soldiers and single men. Their descendants became known as Minh Hương and they strongly identified as Han despite influence from Vietnamese mothers. They did not wear the Manchu hairstyle unlike later Han migrants to Vietnam during the Qing dynasty.

After the Qing conquest of China proper, many Han people who refused to submit themselves to the Qing fled abroad. Ethnic Han leaders such as Mạc Cửu, Trần Thượng Xuyên and Dương Ngạn Địch arrived in the Mekong Delta where they established their own polities in Ha Tien, Bien Hoa and My Tho. They later submitted to the Nguyễn lords, who provided them with noble titles and offer protection against Khmer and Siam threats. Many Minh Hương such as Trịnh Hoài Đức and Ngô Nhân Tịnh became Nguyen ministers and played important roles in the Vietnamese exploration and settlement of Mekong Delta.

In official records of Nguyễn dynasty, they were called  Minh nhân (明人) or Minh Hương to distinguish with those ethnic Han (Thanh nhân 清人) from Qing China.

Minh Hương often married with local Viet (Kinh) people. Since 1829, Minh Hương were treated as Vietnamese instead of Han. They were not allowed to go to China, and also not allowed to wear the Manchu queue.

In the present day, most of Minh Hương adopt Vietnamese culture. They are regarded as Kinh people instead of Hoa people by the Vietnamese government. They also recognize themselves as Kinh people.

Famous Minh Hương
Dương Ngạn Địch (楊彥迪): general of Nguyễn lord, ruler of Biên Hòa. 
Trần Thượng Xuyên (陳上川): general of Nguyễn lord, ruler of Mỹ Tho. 
Trần Đại Định (陳大定): general of Nguyễn lord
Trần Đại Lực (陳大力): general of Nguyễn lord
Mạc Cửu (鄚玖): founding ruler of the Principality of Hà Tiên
Mạc Thiên Tứ (鄚天賜): ruler of the Principality of Hà Tiên
Mạc Tử Sanh (鄚子泩): general of Nguyễn lord
Võ Trường Toản (武長纘): scholar in 18th century 
Trịnh Hoài Đức (鄭懷德): mandarin and scholar during Gia Long's reign
Ngô Nhân Tịnh (吳仁靜): mandarin and scholar during Gia Long's reign
Phan Thanh Giản (潘清簡): mandarin during Tự Đức's reign 
Trần Tiễn Thành (陳踐誠): mandarin during Tự Đức's reign

See also
Chinese people in Vietnam
Peranakan
Thirty-six families from Min

References

 
Chinese emigrants to Vietnam
Ethnic groups in Vietnam